Chicago is a 1926 play written by Maurine Dallas Watkins that is best known as the inspiration for the 1975 Broadway musical of the same name. The play, while fiction, is a satire based on two unrelated 1924 court cases involving two women, Beulah Annan (the inspiration for Roxie Hart) and Belva Gaertner (the inspiration for Velma) who were both suspected and later acquitted of murder, whom Watkins had covered for the Chicago Tribune as a reporter.

Watkins wrote the script (originally titled Brave Little Woman) as a class assignment while attending the Yale Drama School. The play debuted on Broadway at the Sam Harris Theatre in late December 1926, directed by George Abbott, where it ran for 172 performances.

To avoid confusion with the musical play and rights held by that show's producers and creators, the play is now titled Play Ball when it is performed.

Real-life inspiration
Annan, the model for the character of Roxie Hart, was 23 when she was accused of the April 3, 1924, murder of Harry Kalstedt. The Tribune reported that Annan played the foxtrot record "Hula Lou" over and over for two hours before calling her husband to say she killed a man who "tried to make love to her". She was found not guilty on May 25, 1924. Annan's husband Albert, a car mechanic who emptied his bank accounts to pay for her defense only to be publicly dumped the day after the trial, served as the basis for Amos Hart. Kalstedt served as the model for Fred Casely. Velma is based on Gaertner (also known as Belle Brown), who was a cabaret singer. The body of Walter Law was discovered slumped over the steering wheel of Gaertner's abandoned car on March 12, 1924. Two police officers testified that they had seen a woman getting into the car and shortly thereafter heard gunshots. A bottle of gin and an automatic pistol were found on the floor of the car. Gaertner was acquitted on June 6, 1924. Lawyers William Scott Stewart and W. W. O'Brien were models for a composite character in Chicago, "Billy Flynn."

Watkins' sensational columns documenting these trials proved so popular that she decided to write a play based on them. The show received both popular and critical acclaim and even made it to Broadway in 1926, running for 172 performances.

Characters

Adaptations
Cecil B. DeMille produced a silent film version, Chicago (1927), starring former Mack Sennett bathing beauty Phyllis Haver as Roxie Hart.  In comparing the play to the silent movie, critic Michael Phillips writes, "Watkins' play is harsh, satirical and cynical; the movie, less so. It's more of a melodrama, and to appease the censor boards, producer DeMille meted out punishment to his sinning characters where none existed previously."

The story was adapted again as the 1942 film Roxie Hart starring Ginger Rogers; but in this version, Roxie was innocent of the murder charge against her.

In the 1960s, Gwen Verdon read the play and asked her husband, Bob Fosse, about the possibility of creating a musical adaptation. Fosse approached playwright Watkins numerous times to buy the rights, but she repeatedly declined. However, upon her death in 1969, her estate sold the rights to producer Richard Fryer, Verdon, and Fosse. John Kander and Fred Ebb began work on the musical score, modeling each number on a traditional vaudeville number or a vaudeville performer. This format made explicit the show's comparison between "justice", "show-business", and contemporary society. Ebb and Fosse penned the book of the musical, and Fosse also directed and choreographed. The musical version in turn was adapted as the 2002 film Chicago, starring Renee Zellweger, Richard Gere and Catherine Zeta-Jones; this adaptation won the Academy Award for Best Picture at the 75th Academy Awards.

See also
Machinal, another play from the 1920s, inspired by a real-life case of a woman convicted of murder
The Front Page, another play from the 1920s, inspired by news coverage of the Chicago criminal justice system

References

External links

 Full text of Chicago at the Internet Archive
 

1926 plays